Dorcadion pusillum is a species of longhorn beetle of the subfamily Lamiinae.

Description
The first segment of the antennae and legs is reddish brown. The back and shoulder are striped and dull, and the color is either gray or pale brown. The suture and manifold are bright white. There is a black stripe on the bugs spine. The elytron is with dark round spots.

Subspecies
Dorcadion pusillum berladense (Pic, 1903)
Dorcadion pusillum pusillum (Küster, 1847)
Dorcadion pusillum tanaiticum (Kasatkin, 2002)

References

pusillum
Beetles described in 1847